After 1973 the acquisition of additional high-speed diesel locomotives was considered to complement the BDZ park for the Septemvri - Dobrinishte line and especially for the replacement of the steam tram along the line Cherven Bryag - Oryahovo. The acquisition of class 75 locomotives failed for a number of reasons. Thus a construction and supply contract was signed with the Romanian plant "23 August" (now FAUR) - Bucharest. The locomotives were built to the technical conditions of BDZ, reflecting the experience of the already 10 years of operation of the class 75 locomotives.

Initially, a prototype of the locomotive was designated 76-15 (after the test runs the machine had to be returned to the factory for refurbishment when the locomotives 76-01 to 76-14 were already under construction) to be delivered as the last locomotive in the series. The program was implemented and all locomotives were put into operation from May to September 1977, and 76-15 arrived in February 1978.

Initially, all class 76 locomotives were assigned to the Cherven Bryag depot. This replaced the steam traction on the line entirely. Later it was found that their number was bigger than required and five were sent to the Septemvri depot (76-11 to 76-15). Their operation shows, despite the proximity of the technical parameters to those of class 75, that they have lower operating capacities, more failures and lower quality of workmanship. After the cessation of the operation of the Cherven Bryag - Oryahovo and Varvara - Pazardjik lines in 2002, the scrapping of locomotives in the two main narrow-gauge depots (Cherven Bryag and Septemvri) took place and in the park of BDZ four locomotives of class 76 remained. In 2009, BDZ sold 3 of them to Argentina, and one was left for a museum exhibit and was stored in the Septemvri depot.

Operational and Factory Data for Locomotives

Sources 

 Translated from Локомотиви БДЖ серия 76.000
 Димитър Деянов, Локомотивното стопанство на БДЖ 1947 – 1990, Sofia, 1993

References 

760 mm gauge locomotives
Narrow gauge locomotives of Bulgaria
B-B locomotives
FAUR locomotives
Railway locomotives introduced in 1976